is the first studio album by the Japanese girl band Princess Princess, released on May 21, 1987, by CBS Sony. It features the band's debut single "Koi wa Balance". In contrast to the band's 1986 debut EP Kiss de Crime, the album features songwriting credits primarily by the band members.

The album peaked at No. 38 on Oricon's albums chart.

Track listing 
All music is arranged by Princess Princess.

Charts

References

External links
 
 
 

Princess Princess (band) albums
1987 albums
Sony Music Entertainment Japan albums
Japanese-language albums